BNS Padma was a  of the Bangladesh Navy. She was gifted by the Indian Navy in 1973. The ship was commissioned by the Bangladesh Navy on 12 April 1973.

See also
 List of historic ships of the Bangladesh Navy

References

Ships of the Bangladesh Navy
Patrol vessels of the Bangladesh Navy